
Gmina Radymno is a rural gmina (administrative district) in Jarosław County, Subcarpathian Voivodeship, in south-eastern Poland, on the border with Ukraine. Its seat is the town of Radymno, although the town is not part of the territory of the gmina.

Villages
Gmina Radymno contains the villages and settlements of Budzyń, Chałupki Chotynieckie, Chotyniec, Duńkowice, Grabowiec, Korczowa, Łazy, Michałówka, Młyny, Nienowice, Ostrów, Piaski, Skołoszów, Sośnica, Sośnica-Brzeg, Święte, Zabłotce, Zaleska Wola and Zamojsce.

Neighbouring gminas
Gmina Radymno is bordered by the town of Radymno and by the gminas of Chłopice, Jarosław, Laszki, Orły, Stubno and Wielkie Oczy. It also borders Ukraine.

References

Polish official population figures 2006

Radymno
Jarosław County